The 2014–15 season was Sport Lisboa e Benfica's 111th season in existence and the club's 81st consecutive season in the top flight of Portuguese football.

Benfica won their second consecutive and 34th overall Primeira Liga title, their second consecutive and sixth overall Taça da Liga, and their fifth Supertaça Cândido de Oliveira.

Season overview

July
In the 111th season, manager Jorge Jesus started his sixth consecutive season at Benfica, for the first time in the last 60 years, since János Biri. The president Luís Filipe Vieira started his eleventh consecutive season.

After winning an historic treble, Benfica lost many players of its starting XI. Nemanja Matić had moved to Chelsea on 15 January 2014. Guilherme Siqueira had returned to Granada in June. On 25 June, Ezequiel Garay had moved to Zenit Saint Petersburg. Rodrigo and André Gomes' economic rights had been sold to an investment firm on 31 January; in July, they moved to Valencia on loan. On 15 July, Lazar Marković moved to Liverpool. The next day, Jan Oblak moved to Atlético Madrid.

August
On 4 August, after seven seasons, Benfica's ninth all-time top scorer, Óscar Cardozo, moved to Trabzonspor.

On 10 August, Benfica won its fifth Supercup, beating Rio Ave 3–2 on penalties after a goalless draw. A severely remodeled squad, only presented seven starters of the Taça de Portugal final played just two months earlier: Luisão, Maxi Pereira, Rúben Amorim, Eduardo Salvio, Enzo Pérez, Nicolás Gaitán and Lima. The new players Talisca, Derley, Eliseu and Bebé made their official debut for Benfica. Benfica dominated throughout the match but was unable to score on multiple occasions, finally beating Rio Ave on penalties, after Artur defended three of them. It was the first time since 2010 that Benfica played the Supercup, winning a previous one in 2005. With this conquest, Benfica became the only Portuguese club to have won all four domestic titles in a year.

On 17 August, in the league's first day, Benfica beat Paços de Ferreira (2–0) with goals from Maxi Pereira and Salvio, with Artur saving a penalty in the 10th minute. Additionally, Benfica won the first matchday ten years later; the first with Jorge Jesus and the second during the ten-year term of Luís Filipe Vieira. On 19 August, Júlio César joined Benfica. On 22 August, Benfica signed Andreas Samaris. On 24 August, Benfica won at Boavista with a strike by Eliseu from 25 meters out. During the match, played in an artificial turf, Rúben Amorim got severely injured, with news in next day reporting an anterior cruciate ligament injury. On 31 August, Benfica drew against Sporting CP (1–1). Nicolás Gaitán scored the first goal, while Artur made a mistake which allowed Islam Slimani to tie the match. It was the first league goal for Sporting at the Estádio da Luz since 29 April 2007. It was also the first time in seven seasons that Sporting made any points in a league match against Benfica, while playing as a visitor at the Derby de Lisboa.

September
On 1 September, Benfica signed Bryan Cristante and extended Sílvio's loan. On 11 September, Benfica signed Jonas. On 12 September, after the early break for the Euro 2016 qualifying, Benfica returned with a 0–5 win at Vitória de Setúbal, with a hat-trick from Talisca, in his first goals in the Primeira Liga. Furthermore, Samaris and Cristante made their debuts for Benfica, while Ola John scored his first goal in the league. On 16 September, in the first matchday of the Champions League, Benfica lost 0–2 to Zenit. Hulk scored, Artur was sent off for a foul on Danny outside of the box, and former Benfica player Witsel scored the second goal. It was Benfica's first home defeat in 51 matches, and the first home defeat in the Champions League since 2 October 2012. On 21 September, Benfica struggled to defeat Moreirense, suffering an early goal from João Pedro in the debut of Júlio César. In the second half, after Marcelo Oliveira was sent off for tackling Talisca, Eliseu scored from 30 meters out; eight minutes later Maxi Pereira untied the match; and in the final minutes Lima scored from penalty kick after being tackled in the box. On 27 September, Benfica won at Estoril (2–3) with two goals from Talisca and one from Lima. Winning 0–2, the Eagles allowed Estoril to tie the match, with goals from Diogo Amado and Kléber, but in an individual effort from Derley, Lima scored the winning goal.

October
On 1 October, Benfica lost at Bayer Leverkusen (3–1) and remained point-less in the Champions League group stage. Nonetheless, four days later Benfica won 4–0 against Arouca, in the debut of Lisandro López, Jonas and Pizzi, maintaining the lead in Portuguese league. On 18 October, Benfica defeated Covilhã (2–3) with a hat-trick from Jonas in the third round of Taça de Portugal. On 22 October, Benfica drew at Monaco (0–0) and achieved their first point in the Champions League. On 26 October, Benfica lost for the first time in the league, (1–2) at Braga, but kept the first position. On 31 October, Benfica beat Rio Ave (1–0) with a goal from Talisca, who scored his fourth consecutive goal in the Primeira Liga.

November
On 4 November, Benfica beat Monaco with a goal from Talisca and secured the first victory in group stage of Champions League. On 9 November, Benfica won at Nacional (1–2), with goals from Salvio and Jonas, and maintained the lead of Primeira Liga. On 22 November, Benfica advanced to the fifth round of the Taça de Portugal by beating Moreirense (4–1), with Jonas and Salvio scoring two goals each. On 26 November, Benfica lost at Zenit (1–0) and were eliminated from European competitions following the Monaco win at Leverkusen. On 30 November, Benfica won at Académica (0–2) with goals from Nicolás Gaitán and Luisão, and kept the first place in the Portuguese league.

December
On 6 December, Benfica continued leading the Portuguese league by defeating Belenenses (3–0) with goals from Lima, Pérez, and Salvio. On 9 December, Benfica draw with Bayer Leverkusen (0–0). On 14 December, Benfica defeated Porto at the Estádio do Dragão (0–2) with two goals from Lima, securing the first place in Primeira Liga with six more points than the second-placed Porto. On 18 December, Benfica was eliminated from Taça de Portugal by Braga (1–2). On 21 December, Benfica beat Gil Vicente (1–0) in Primeira Liga with a goal from Nicolás Gaitán. On 30 December, Benfica beat Nacional (1–0) with a header from Jonas in the third round of Taça da Liga, their last match of 2014. Miralem Sulejmani returned after suffering an injury in May 2014.

January
On 1 January, Nélson Oliveira moved to Swansea City on loan. On 2 January, Enzo Pérez moved to Valencia. On 4 January, Benfica beat Penafiel (0–3) with goals from Talisca, Jonas and Jardel, achieving seven consecutive wins in Primeira Liga, thus scoring in every league match since 21 April 2012 (79 matches). Gonçalo Guedes made his debut. On 8 January, Bebé (Tiago) moved to Córdoba on loan. On 10 January, Benfica defeated Vitória de Guimarães (3–0) with goals from Jonas, Ola John and Nicolás Gaitán. Eliseu and Salvio returned after injury, the former was out of competition since 31 October. It was Júlio César's sixth consecutive league match without conceding a goal, in a total of 629 minutes. On 14 January, Benfica beat Arouca (4–0) in the third round of the Taça da Liga and became leader of Group A with six points. Pizzi, Cristante, Salvio, and Jonas scored the goals. Rui Fonte debuted and Sílvio returned after suffering an injury in April 2014. On 18 January, Benfica won at Marítimo (0–4) with goals from Salvio (2), Ola John and Lima. It was Benfica's ninth consecutive win and seventh match without conceding a goal in Primeira Liga, leading it with 46 points in 17 matches, with an efficiency of 90.2%, the best record of the Top 20 leagues in Europe. On 21 January, Benfica won at Moreirense (0–2) and secured the first place in the Taça da Liga's Group A with nine points, advancing to the semi-finals, without conceding a goal. On 26 January, Benfica lost at Paços de Ferreira (1–0) from a penalty kick in the 90th minute, ending the series of consecutive wins (9) and clean sheets (7) in the league. Lima failed a penalty kick in the first-half. Despite this, Benfica kept the lead with 6 more points than the second classified which also lost. On 29 January, Jonathan Rodríguez joined Benfica on loan from Peñarol. On 31 January, Benfica beat Boavista (3–0) with goals from Lima, Maxi Pereira and Jonas.

February
On 8 February, Benfica drew at Sporting CP (1–1) with a last-minute goal from Jardel in the 94th minute, and continued leading the Primeira Liga with 4 more points than the second classified. On 11 February, Benfica advanced to their sixth Taça da Liga final and second consecutive without conceding a goal, after beating Vitória de Setúbal (3–0) with goals from Talisca, Pizzi and Jonas. Rúben Amorim returned as a substitute after suffering an injury in August 2014. On 15 February, Benfica beat Vitória de Setúbal (3–0) in Primeira Liga, with goals from Jardel and Lima (2). On 21 February, Benfica won at Moreirense (1–3) with goals from Luisão, Eliseu and Jonas; and continued leading the Primeira Liga. On 28 February – on the club's 111th anniversary – Benfica thrashed Estoril (6–0) with goals from Luisão, Salvio, Pizzi, Jonas (2) and Lima; and set the league's biggest home win.

March
On 8 March, Benfica won at Arouca (1–3) with goals from Jonas and Lima (2). On 14 March, Benfica beat Braga (2–0) with goals from Jonas and Eliseu. On 21 March, Benfica lost at Rio Ave (2–1). Salvio scored for the Eagles.

April
On 4 April, Benfica beat Nacional (3–1) with goals from Jonas (2) and Lima. On 11 April, Benfica defeated Académica (5–1) with Jardel, Jonas (2), Lima and Ljubomir Fejsa scoring the goals; Fejsa returned to the first-team after an injury in April 2014, while Jonathan Rodríguez debuted in Primeira Liga. On 18 April, Benfica won at Belenenses (0–2), with Jonas scoring twice for a third consecutive league match. On 26 April, Benfica drew against Porto (0–0), and kept leading the Primeira Liga, three points ahead. It was the first time since 11 April 2009 that Benfica did not score at home in a league match.

May
On 2 May, Benfica won at Gil Vicente (0–5) with goals from Maxi Pereira (2), Jonas, Luisão and Lima. On 9 May, Benfica beat Penafiel (4–0) with goals from Lima (2), Jonas and Pizzi. On 17 May, Benfica drew at Guimarães (0–0) and became Portuguese champions for a second consecutive time, with one game to spare, three points ahead of Porto, which had drawn at Belenenses. On 23 May, Benfica beat Marítimo (4–1) with goals from Lima (2) and Jonas (2) in their last league match.

On 29 May, Benfica played their last match of the season, defeating Marítimo (2–1) in the Taça da Liga final, with goals from Jonas and Ola John, thus winning the club's sixth Taça da Liga and 75th title overall, a new Portuguese record.

Players

Squad information

Transfers

In

Loan in

Loan return

Out

Loan out

Overall transfer activity

Spending
Other: €0

Summer:  €31,940,000

Winter:  €2,000,000

Total:  €33,940,000

Income
Other:  €33,300,000

Summer:  €40,525,000

Winter:  €42,250,000

Total:  €116,075,000

Expenditure
Other:  €33,300,000

Summer:  €8,585,000

Winter:  €40,250,000

Total:  €82,135,000

Notes

Technical staff

(B) – Benfica B player

Includes Supertaça Cândido de Oliveira

Goalscorers

Hat-tricks

(H) – Home ; (A) – Away

Clean sheets
Number of matches inside brackets.

1Includes Supertaça Cândido de Oliveira

* Includes 1 shared match on Round 19 against Boavista.

Disciplinary record

Awards

References

S.L. Benfica seasons
Benfica
Benfica
Portuguese football championship-winning seasons